A spitting cobra is any of several species of cobras that can defensively spray a toxic secretion from their fangs. This secretion functions as both a venom (that can be injected via a wound) and a toxungen (that can be sprayed on the target surface).

Venom
The spat toxungen is generally harmless on intact mammalian skin (although contact can result in delayed blistering of the area), but can cause permanent blindness if introduced to the eye; if left untreated it may cause chemosis and corneal swelling.

The toxungen sprays out in distinctive geometric patterns when muscles squeeze the glands to squirt it out through forward-facing holes near the tips of the fangs. Individuals of some species of spitting cobras make hissing exhalations/lunging movements of their heads when "spitting", and such actions may assist in propelling the venom, but research does not support the hypothesis that they play any major functional part except possibly enhancing the threatening effect of the behavior. While spitting is typically their primary form of defense, all spitting cobras also can deliver their toxin as a venom by biting.

Most spitting cobras' venom/toxungen is significantly cytotoxic, apart from the neurotoxic and cardiotoxic effects typical of other cobra species. The ability to spit likely evolved in cobras three times independently through convergent evolution. In each of these three events, the venom convergently evolved to be more effective at creating pain in mammals to serve as a better deterrent, with each of the three evolutions roughly correlating with the evolution and/or arrival of early hominins.

Species

‡: Not a “true spitting cobra”, although these species have the ability to “eject” venom, they rarely do so.

African cobras:
 Naja ashei
 Naja katiensis
 Naja mossambica
 Naja nigricincta
 Naja nigricincta woodi  
 Naja nigricollis 
 Naja nubiae
 Naja pallida

Asian cobras:
 Naja atra ‡
 Naja kaouthia ‡
 Naja sagittifera ‡ 
 Naja mandalayensis
 Naja philippinensis
 Naja samarensis
 Naja siamensis
 Naja sputatrix
 Naja sumatrana

Spitting snakes in other families:
 Hemachatus haemachatus

Some of the Viperidae have been reported to spit occasionally.

References

 Greene, Harry W. (1997) Snakes: The Evolution of Mystery in Nature. University of California Press, Berkeley and Los Angeles, California.

External links

 Video of an African red spitting cobra spraying its venom
 Video of an African red spitting cobra feeding
 Discovery News 'Spitting Cobras' Sharp-Shooting Secrets"

Elapidae
Snakes of Africa
Snakes of Asia